Kudiattam is a 1986 documentary film on 2000-year-old Sanskrit drama tradition of Kerala state of India, Kutiyattam. The film is directed by Prakash Jha. The film features greatest Kutiyattam maestro of modern times Guru Natyacharya Māni Mādhava Chākyār. The film has won Indian government's National Film Award for Best Arts/Cultural Film in 1987.

See also
Māni Mādhava Chākyār
Kutiyattam
Prakash Jha

References

External links 
 

Films directed by Prakash Jha
1986 films
Documentary films about theatre
Theatre in India